Kerry Dienelt (born 25 February 1969, in Darwin, Northern Territory) is a former softball catcher from Australia, who won a bronze medal at the 1996 Summer Olympics and 2000 Summer Olympics.

In addition to playing for the Australian national team, she also played for UCLA from 1988 to 1991. She was a member of the NCAA championship squad in 1988, 1989 and 1990 and made the All-tournament team all four years. In 2004, Dienelt was inducted into the Softball Australia Hall of Fame.

References

1969 births
Living people
Australian Institute of Sport softball players
Australian softball players
UCLA Bruins softball players
Olympic softball players of Australia
Softball players at the 1996 Summer Olympics
Softball players at the 2000 Summer Olympics
Olympic bronze medalists for Australia
People from Darwin, Northern Territory
Olympic medalists in softball
Medalists at the 2000 Summer Olympics
Medalists at the 1996 Summer Olympics